The Sac River (pronounced sack) is a river in the Ozarks of Southwest Missouri. The stream passes through the northeast corner of Lawrence County then re-enters Greene County. The stream enters Dade County northwest of Ash Grove. The stream enters Stockton Lake in Dade County between Dadeville and Greenfield, then flows north exiting Stockton Lake in Cedar County. The stream meanders north into St. Clair County, passes under US Route 54 and enters the Osage River in Truman Reservoir southeast of Osceola.

Large portions of the Sac River and the Little Sac River are inundated by Stockton Lake.

The river was named after the Sac Indians. The Big Eddy Site, an archaeological dig, is along the Sac River within Cedar County.  Eleven feet of river sediment at the site provides a stratigraphy that suggests more than 10,000 years of nearly constant occupation by American Indians, potentially pre-dating the Clovis culture and contributing to the knowledge of the Dalton and San Patrice cultures.

See also
List of rivers of Missouri

References

External links 
The Big Eddy Site, from the Center for Archeological Research at Missouri State University

Rivers of Missouri
Bodies of water of the Ozarks
Rivers of Cedar County, Missouri
Rivers of Dade County, Missouri
Rivers of Greene County, Missouri
Rivers of Lawrence County, Missouri
Rivers of St. Clair County, Missouri
Tributaries of the Missouri River